The 23rd season of Arthur started airing on PBS Kids in the United States on October 14, 2019. R.L. Stine guest starred on the episode "Fright Night" as Buster's Uncle Bob. This is the only season not to include Mr. Ratburn as part of the main cast. This season is the shortest season of the show tied with (Season 24), containing 3 episodes with 5 segments.

Episodes

Production
Oasis Animation produced the 23rd season of Arthur. Oasis Animation started producing Arthur episodes from Season 20.

References

2019 American television seasons
2019 Canadian television seasons
Arthur (TV series) seasons